Wangaratta Wahine is an album by Australian band The Captain Matchbox Whoopee Band, released in 1974 and was their second album. It was recorded at top recording studio Armstrong Studios in Melbourne and the cover art was by famed Australian artist Michael Leunig.

Track listing

Charts

Personnel 
Mic Conway: (vocals, washboard, phonograph, horn, ukulele, jug)
Jim Conway: (harmonica, kazoo, whistles, vocals)
Fred Olbrei: (violin, vocals)
Dave Flett: (bass, vocals, harmonies, ukulele)
Geoff Hales: (drums, washboard, tap dancing)
Jim Niven: (keyboards)
Mick Fleming: (banjo, mandolin)
Jon Snyder: (guitar)

References

1974 albums
The Captain Matchbox Whoopee Band albums